Resmethrin is a pyrethroid insecticide with many uses, including control of the adult mosquito population.  

The resmethrin molecule has four stereoisomers determined by cis-trans orientation around a carbon triangle and chirality.  Technical resmethrin is a mixture of (1R,trans)-, (1R,cis)-, (1S,trans)-, and (1S,cis)- isomers, typically in a ratio of 4:1:4:1.  The 1R isomers (both trans and cis) show strong insecticidal activity, while the 1S isomers do not.   The (1R,trans)- isomer is also known as bioresmethrin,(+)-trans-resmethrin, or d-trans-resmethrin; although bioresmethrin has been used alone as a pesticide active ingredient, it is not now registered as a separate active ingredient (AI) by the U.S. EPA.  The (1R,cis)- isomer is known as cismethrin, but this is also not registered in the U.S. for use alone as a pesticide AI.

Commercial trade names for products that contain resmethrin are: Chrysron, Crossfire, Lethalaire V-26, Pynosect, Raid Flying Insect Killer, Scourge, SPB-1382, Sun-Bugger #4, Synthrin, Syntox, Vectrin, and Whitmire PT-110.

References

External links

Resmethrin Technical Fact Sheet - National Pesticide Information Center
Pyrethrins and Pyrethroids Fact Sheet - National Pesticide Information Center
Resmethrin Pesticide Information Profile - Extension Toxicology Network
MSDS for Scourge Formula II
WHO/FAO DATA SHEETS ON PESTICIDES,No. 83,RESMETHRIN World Health Organization & Food and Agriculture Organization
Reregistration Eligibility Decision for Resmethrin (2006) - U.S. Environmental Protection Agency

Furans
Benzyl compounds
Chrysanthemate esters
Cyclopropanes